Lissette Alexandra Antes Castillo (born 2 May 1991 in La Libertad) is an Ecuadorian freestyle wrestler. She competed in the freestyle 55 kg event at the 2012 Summer Olympics; she defeated Olga Butkevych in the 1/8 finals and was eliminated by Jackeline Rentería in the quarterfinals.  She competed in the women's lightweight event at the 2016 Summer Olympics, but was defeated by Mariana Cherdivara in the first round.

References

External links
 

1991 births
Living people
Ecuadorian female sport wrestlers
Olympic wrestlers of Ecuador
Wrestlers at the 2012 Summer Olympics
Wrestlers at the 2016 Summer Olympics
Pan American Games medalists in wrestling
Pan American Games bronze medalists for Ecuador
Wrestlers at the 2015 Pan American Games
South American Games gold medalists for Ecuador
South American Games medalists in wrestling
Competitors at the 2014 South American Games
Wrestlers at the 2019 Pan American Games
Medalists at the 2015 Pan American Games
Medalists at the 2019 Pan American Games
Pan American Wrestling Championships medalists
20th-century Ecuadorian women
21st-century Ecuadorian women